Club Deportivo Tropezón is a football team based in Tanos, Torrelavega in the autonomous community of Cantabria. Founded in 1983, it plays in the Segunda División RFEF – Group 2. Its stadium is Santa Ana with a capacity of 1,500 seats.

History
El Tropezón  was founded in 1981 by a few young neighbours from Tanos. Their intention was to create a "Cultural, Sport, Social and Gastronomic" club and to name it "El Tropezón", the club has been promoting aspects ever since it was founded and continues today.

During the first years of the club, the team played in the Primera Regional and Regional Preferente leagues, in which the team played for 7 years.

In the 1990–91 season, the team was promoted to Tercera División league, starting a new era for the club. For another 7 years they will remain in this category. In the 1994–95 season, the team plays its first promotion series. The team wins the 1996–97 and 1997–98 leagues, finally achieving the promotion to Segunda División B.

The team started its first year in Segunda División B playing the field they rented until, on 29 November 1998 they were relocated in the newly open "Santa Ana". The limited budget and the inexperience relegates the team back to Tercera División for the 1999–2000 season. That season would last only another year after finishing second in the league and winning in Guecho against the historic Arenas Club in the promotion series.

The return to the Segunda División B turned out to be a disappointment for the club, again the limited budget could not save the team from been relegated to Tercera División once again.

Since them the team has remained in Tercera División, playing the promotion series in 2002, 2003, 2004, 2007, 2009, 2010 and 2013. Is in year, 2013, when the team will earn the promotion back to Segunda División B. In the 2013–14 season, the team played in the League against Cantabria's most successful team, Racing de Santander, which lost two categories in a row. That season in the Segunda División B was difficult for CD Tropezón, but the club finally finished 12th, remaining its place in the league.

Season to season

4 seasons in Segunda División B
1 season in Segunda División RFEF
26 seasons in Tercera División

Current squad

References

External links
CD Tropezón Official Website 
Futbolme team profile 

Football clubs in Cantabria
Association football clubs established in 1983
1983 establishments in Spain